Nicole Thyssen (born 5 June 1988) is a Dutch retired tennis player.

In her career, Thyssen won five singles titles and 18 doubles titles on the ITF Women's Circuit. She reached her best singles ranking of world No. 219 in September 2008. Her career-high ranking in doubles is 153, reached in October 2008.

Thyssen made her WTA Tour main-draw debut at the 2008 Rosmalen Open, in the doubles event partnering Arantxa Rus.

ITF Circuit finals

Singles: 6 (5 titles, 1 runner-up)

Doubles: 23 (18 titles, 5 runner-ups)

References

External links
 
 
 

1988 births
Living people
Dutch female tennis players
Sportspeople from Delft